Curium(III) bromide is the bromide salt of curium. It has an orthorhombic crystal structure.

References

Curium compounds
bromides